Filbert Street was a football stadium in Leicester, England, which served as the home of Leicester City F.C. from 1891 until 2002. Although officially titled the City Business Stadium in the early 1990s, it remained known almost exclusively by its address, like many English football stadiums.

History

Early years 
Leicester City was formed in 1884. The club was then named Leicester Fosse, as its founders mostly lived in the west end of the city, through which the Fosse Way ran. In 1884–85 it played at a ground known as the Racecourse, before sharing Victoria Park with the Leicester Tigers rugby club for two years. Leicester Fosse played at the Belgrave Road Cycle Track for a year, but returned to Victoria Park after the rugby club offered a higher rent to the owners of the Cycle Track.

Leicester Fosse became a professional club in 1889 and laid out its own ground at Mill Lane, just north of Filbert Street. The club was soon forced to move, however, as the local Corporation requested the land for development. The site of what was to become Filbert Street was prepared during the summer of 1891, while Leicester Fosse temporarily played at the Aylestone Road Cricket Ground. Local legend suggests that the new ground was identified by a Miss Westland, the niece of one of the club's founders, Joseph Johnson.

The stadium initially consisted of simple earth banks and a small main stand on the west side, until 1921, when a new and much larger main stand was built. In 1927, a new stand was built at the south end (known as the Spion Kop), and became known as the "Double Decker". The roof which had previously covered the Kop was rebuilt at the north, or Filbert Street end of the ground. It was in this form that Filbert Street saw its record attendance of 47,298 for the Fifth Round FA Cup tie, against Tottenham Hotspur, on 18 February 1928. This game also saw many more spectators watch the match from the roof of the Filbert Street end. The first phase of ground development concluded with the covering of the East or Popular side in 1939.

Second World War and after 
The middle section of the Main Stand suffered bomb damage in 1940, and was later further damaged by a serious fire. By 1949, the stand had been rebuilt, with much of the labour, ironically, being supplied by German POWs at a nearby camp. The ground's maximum capacity was now around 42,000. Floodlights were installed and first used for a match against German club Borussia Dortmund in October 1957.

After just surviving a council vote to terminate their lease in the late 1940s, City purchased the freehold of the ground in 1962, for the sum of £30,500. In 1971, the first moves towards an all-seater stadium were taken, as the North and East sides were converted to seating. Four years later, 20 basic executive boxes were added to the North Stand. A pioneering polythene cover was introduced to protect the pitch in 1971. The Air Dome covered an area of 90,000 square feet, weighed 24 cwt and took 15 men two hours to lay out and inflate using four electric fans. The Air Dome was removed in 1982.

All-seater stadium 
At the beginning of the 1990s, after considering moving to a new stadium, and a total redevelopment of Filbert Street which would have seen the pitch rotated by 90 degrees, onto the car park behind the Main Stand, City opted to build a new Main Stand, demolishing the existing structure in the summer of 1992. It was anticipated that further modernisation work would take place in the future.

Completed in December 1993, the Carling Stand held 9,500 seated spectators and expanded corporate facilities, costing £6 million. In 1994, the final terraced area – the Kop – was converted to seating giving Filbert Street an all-seated capacity of 21,500, and bringing it into compliance with the Taylor Report which required all Premier League and Division One teams to have all-seater capacity.

Move and demolition 

Following the success of the club under Martin O'Neill during the later part of the 1990s, an expanded stadium was required for higher attendances and to provide better facilities. Expansion of Filbert Street would have been very difficult, as the North and East Stands backed onto housing which would have been expensive to place under a compulsory purchase order. Although expansion was considered, by 1998 the decision had been taken to move to a completely new stadium. After a failed attempt to build a 40,000 all-seater stadium at Bede Island South (on the other bank of the nearby River Soar), the club purchased Freeman's Wharf, a former power station site 200 yards south of Filbert Street. Work began on a 32,500 seater stadium during 2001 and it was opened in July 2002.

Filbert Street was sold to a development company for £3.75 million in March 2002, two months before the last game was played there. The last game to be played at Filbert Street was the last game of the 2001–02 season, a 2–1 victory against Tottenham Hotspur – one of just five league games that Leicester won during that season, culminating in relegation to Division One. Matt Piper scored the last goal scored at the ground, bringing to an end 111 years of football there. In the autumn of 2002, Rotherham United expressed interest in purchasing the Carling Stand and moving it to their Millmoor stadium, but these plans were soon abandoned and the decade-old stand would soon be demolished along with the rest of Filbert Street.

Demolition of Filbert Street was begun in March 2003. Part of the site is now home to the 'Filbert Village' development, built as accommodation for students for the nearby De Montfort University and University of Leicester. The road running through the development is called Lineker Road after one of Leicester City's most famous players, Gary Lineker. The rest of the site was meant to be developed for housing, but this work was cancelled due to the financial crisis of 2007–2008. It was then leased to a car parking company, but this arrangement was terminated by Leicester City Council in March 2012.

References 

Sources

External links 
 Filbert Street history
 Filbert Street Gallery and Information at Worldstadia
 Demolition of Filbert Street
Football Grounds Guide Article

Defunct football venues in England
Leicester City F.C.
Sports venues in Leicester
Premier League venues
Sports venues completed in 1891
1891 establishments in England
Sports venues demolished in 2003
English Football League venues
Demolished sports venues in the United Kingdom